Sauna Parish is an administrative unit of Preiļi Municipality, Latvia and previously the Preiļi District.

Towns, villages and settlements of Sauna Parish 
  – parish administrative center

References 

Parishes of Latvia
Preiļi Municipality